Wheel-barrowing is a problem that may occur in an aeroplane with a tricycle gear configuration during takeoff or landing. As the aeroplane gains speed during takeoff the wing generates an increasing amount of lift although not enough to raise the aeroplane off the ground. The lift reduces the weight supported by the aeroplane's main wheels and this reduces the main wheels' contribution to directional stability, allowing the nose wheel to destabilise the aeroplane's direction along the ground. This form of wheelbarrowing is easily avoided by the pilot applying back-pressure to the elevator control during the takeoff roll to reduce the weight supported by the nose wheel.

Depending on the severity of the wheel-barrowing, damage to the aircraft can be quite extensive: The propeller of a single engine airplane may strike the ground, damaging it and the engine. A wing can be damaged by striking the ground as the aircraft pivots over the nose-wheel and one main wheel.

Wheel-barrowing may also be caused with a tricycle gear when the turn radius is too sharp for the speed of the aircraft on the ground – much like a child on a tricycle taking too sharp a turn. The problem is exacerbated when brakes are applied during the turn.

See also
 Ground effect (cars)

References

Aerodynamics
Aviation risks